Direxion is a provider of financial products known for its leveraged ETFs. Founded in Alexandria, Virginia, the company also has offices in New York City, Boston, and Hong Kong.

History
Direxion was founded in 1997 under the name Potomac Funds as a provider of mutual funds. The original name referred to the Potomac River near the company's first office in Alexandria, Virginia.  In November 1997, Potomac Funds became the second company to introduce an inverse mutual fund, following a similar move by Rydex Investments in 1994. The company began using the Direxion name in 2006. The use of the letter "X" in the new name was intended to draw attention to the leveraged index funds in the company's offerings. That year the company also opened an office in the Prudential Tower in Boston, Massachusetts.

Direxion launched its first leveraged ETFs in 2008. In November 2008 the company was the first to offer ETFs with 3X leverage, a move that was copied some months later by its competitors ProShares and Rydex Investments. The move made it one of the fastest-growing ETF companies, with its sixteen 3X ETFs reaching a total of $3.4 billion in assets by April 2009. The move towards higher-leverage offerings by the three companies provoked scrutiny from the U.S. Securities and Exchange Commission and the Massachusetts Secretary of the Commonwealth, and a number of broker-dealers stopped selling leveraged ETFs. The criticisms centered around perceived tracking error: the ETFs were designed to achieve the stated multiple of the return on the underlying on a daily basis only (with the cost of the daily rebalancing passed on to investors in the form of higher expense ratios), but commentators suggested that some investors, even institutional investors, had mistakenly tried to use the inverse products as longer-term hedges against their underlyings.

In December 2010, Direxion added 24 ETFs to its range of offerings, including some non-leveraged funds, and continued to expand its offering of non-leveraged funds in 2011. The company's gold miner bull and bear ETFs are among the most-traded gold-related leveraged ETFs. In February 2020, the company announced the launch of its first leveraged environmental, social and corporate governance fund, offering 150% long exposure and 50% short exposure respectively to the best- and worst-scoring companies in the MSCI USA ESG index, with a quarterly rebalance. In March 2020, amidst the 2020 stock market crash, Direxion announced that it would reduce the leverage of ten of its ETFs from 3x to 2x and close eight others. This was part of a broader trend among providers of leveraged ETFs during the first quarter of 2020; nevertheless, Direxion saw inflows of nearly $4 billion during March 2020 alone.

List of funds

Leveraged and inverse ETFs

Thematic and other funds

References

External links

Financial services companies established in 1997